Nanjing Baotai F.C. (Simplified Chinese: 南京宝泰足球俱乐部) is a semi-professional football club its based in Nanjing, China.

Nanjing Baotai F.C. founded by Nanjing Baotai Special Materials Co., LTD. in March 2007.

References

External links
Official site

Defunct football clubs in China

Football clubs in China
2007 establishments in China
Association football clubs established in 2007